Abdulovo is the name of several rural localities in Russia.

Modern localities
Abdulovo, Kuyurgazinsky District, Bashkortostan, a selo in Yakshimbetovsky Selsoviet of Kuyurgazinsky District in the Republic of Bashkortostan
Abdulovo, Yermekeyevsky District, Bashkortostan, a selo in Staroturayevsky Selsoviet of Yermekeyevsky District in the Republic of Bashkortostan

Alternative names
Abdulovo, alternative name of Avdulovo-2, a village in Leontyevskoye Rural Settlement of Stupinsky District in Moscow Oblast; 
Abdulovo, alternative name of Avdulovo, a selo in Voskresensky Selsoviet of Dankovsky District in Lipetsk Oblast;

See also
Abdulino, a town in Orenburg Oblast, Russia
Abdullino, several rural localities in the Republic of Bashkortostan, Russia
Abdulov, Russian last name